The surname Burka may refer to:

Daniel Burka, Canadian creative director for website Digg
Ellen Burka, Canadian figure skating coach
Gelete Burka, Ethiopian middle-distance runner
Jan Burka, Czech painter, graphic artist and sculptor
Petra Burka, Canadian figure skater
Sylvia Burka, Canadian speed skater

See also
Burke (surname) or de Burca
Berk (disambiguation), a surname